Fibricium is a genus of fungi belonging to the family Repetobasidiaceae.

The genus has cosmopolitan distribution.

Species:

Fibricium coriaceum 
Fibricium gloeocystidiatum 
Fibricium lapponicum 
Fibricium rude 
Fibricium subcarneum 
Fibricium subceraceum 
Fibricium subodoratum

References

Hymenochaetales
Agaricomycetes genera